Travis R. Scheefer (born August 14, 1985) is an American ski mountaineer and mountain biker.

Scheefer currently lives at Gunnison, Colorado.

Selected results (ski mountaineering) 
 2010:
 10th, World Championship, relay, together with Max Taam, Ben Parsons and Brandon French
 2012:
 3rd (and 6th in the World ranking), North American Championship, sprint
 7th (and 9th in the World ranking),  North American Championship, individual
 7th (and 9th in the World ranking),  North American Championship, total ranking

References

External links 
 Travis Scheefer at SkiMountaineers.org

1985 births
Living people
American male ski mountaineers
Marathon mountain bikers
People from Gunnison, Colorado
American mountain bikers